Al-Zamilyah is a sub-district located in Mudhaykhirah District, Ibb Governorate, Yemen. Al-Zamilyah had a population of 1,372 according to the 2004 census.

References 

Sub-districts in Mudhaykhirah District